The Kosovo women's national under-18 basketball team is a national basketball team of Kosovo, administered by the Kosovo Basketball Federation.
It represents the country in women's international under-18 basketball competitions.

Championship participations
2016 FIBA U18 Women's European Championship Division C – 5th place
2017 FIBA U18 Women's European Championship Division C – 5th place
2018 FIBA U18 Women's European Championship Division B – 22nd place
2019 FIBA U18 Women's European Championship Division B – 22nd place

See also
Kosovo women's national under-20 basketball team
Kosovo women's national under-16 basketball team
Kosovo men's national under-18 basketball team

References

External links
Archived records of Kosovo team participations

Basketball in Kosovo
Women's national under-18 basketball teams
U